Beacon is a city in Mahaska County, Iowa, United States. The population was 445 at the 2020 census.

History
Coal miners in Beacon joined the United Mine Workers union in 1894, organizing local 178. By 1902, this had 100 members.

Evans, Iowa was a coal camp  to the northwest founded by Evan Evans. This was home to mines that opened in 1879 and were combined and reorganized as the American mine in 1884, at which time, the daily output was 100 tons. This was one of the very few mines where the miners did not join the Bituminous coal miners' strike of 1894. In 1899 United Mine Workers of America local 835 was organized, and in 1902, local 1932 was organized. Memberships in these two locals, combined, was 210 in 1901.

Geography
Beacon's longitude and latitude coordinatesin decimal form are 41.275948, -92.680733.

Demographics

2010 census
As of the census of 2010, there were 494 people, 213 households, and 144 families living in the city. The racial makeup of the city was 98.0% White, 0.6% African American, 1.2% Native American, and 0.2% from two or more races. Hispanic or Latino of any race were 2.0% of the population.

There were 213 households, of which 27.7% had children under the age of 18 living with them, 50.7% were married couples living together, 10.3% had a female householder with no husband present, 6.6% had a male householder with no wife present, and 32.4% were non-families. 27.7% of all households were made up of individuals, and 8% had someone living alone who was 65 years of age or older. The average household size was 2.32 and the average family size was 2.76.

The median age in the city was 41 years. 23.5% of residents were under the age of 18; 5.3% were between the ages of 18 and 24; 26% were from 25 to 44; 29% were from 45 to 64; and 16.4% were 65 years of age or older. The gender makeup of the city was 50.8% male and 49.2% female.

2000 census
As of the census of 2000, there were 518 people, 208 households, and 153 families living in the city. The racial makeup of the city was 96.53% White, 0.39% African American, 0.58% Native American, and 2.51% from two or more races. Hispanic or Latino of any race were 0.39% of the population.

There were 208 households, out of which 31.7% had children under the age of 18 living with them, 57.2% were married couples living together, 11.1% had a female householder with no husband present, and 26.0% were non-families. 21.2% of all households were made up of individuals, and 6.7% had someone living alone who was 65 years of age or older. The average household size was 2.49 and the average family size was 2.85.

In the city, the population was spread out, with 25.1% under the age of 18, 10.4% from 18 to 24, 27.6% from 25 to 44, 23.9% from 45 to 64, and 12.9% who were 65 years of age or older. The median age was 35 years. For every 100 females, there were 109.7 males. For every 100 females age 18 and over, there were 100.0 males.

The median income for a household in the city was $32,000, and the median income for a family was $35,469. Males had a median income of $31,500 versus $26,641 for females. The per capita income for the city was $16,972. About 5.5% of families and 8.8% of the population were below the poverty line, including 8.7% of those under age 18 and 16.4% of those age 65 or over.

Education
The Oskaloosa Community School District operates local public schools.

References

External links

Cities in Iowa
Cities in Mahaska County, Iowa